Bangala or Mɔnɔkɔ na bangála is a Bantu language spoken in the northeast corner of the Democratic Republic of the Congo, it is also spoken in parts of South Sudan and some speakers are still found in the extreme western part of Uganda (e.g., Arua, Koboko). A sister language of Lingala, it is used as a lingua franca by people with different languages and rarely as a first language. In 1991 there were an estimated 3.5 million second-language speakers. It is spoken to the east and northeast of the area where Lingala is spoken. In Lingala, Bangala translates to "People of Mongala". This means people living along the Mongala River. Across Bas-Uele Province, Bangala speakers have to a great extent adopted Lingala.

History
As Lingala spread east and north, its vocabulary was replaced more and more by local languages, and it became more of an interlanguage (a language that is a mix of two or more languages) and was classified as a separate language – Bangala. The vocabulary varies, depending on the first language of the speakers.

 young people in large villages and towns began adopting Lingala so much that their Bangala is becoming more of a dialect than a separate language.

Characteristics
In Bangala, the words for six and seven (motoba, sambo) are replaced with the Swahili words sita and saba. Many Lingala words are replaced by words in Swahili, Zande, other local languages, plus English (bilizi is derived from the English word bridge) and, of course, French.

The verb "to be" is conjugated differently in Bangala. Below is a comparison with Lingala.

The verb prefix ko-, meaning "to" in Lingala is instead ku, as it is in Swahili, so "to be" in Bangala is kusara, not kosala. Many other Bangala words have an /u/ sound where Lingala has an /o/ sound, such as ɓisu (not biso - "we") and mutu (not moto - "person").

Documentation
Several old missionary sketches exist, most of them from the late 19th and early 20th century, e.g., Wtterwulghe (1899), MacKenzie (1910), Heart of Africa Mission (1916), van Mol (1927). However, Bangala as described in these concise overview sketches has changed over the past one hundred years, due to language contact with Ubangian languages and Nilo-Saharan languages of northeastern DR Congo. Currently, researchers from Ghent University, JGU Mainz and Goethe-Universität Frankfurt are working on a grammatical description of the language.

References

External links
Bangala Swadesh list of basic vocabulary words (from Wiktionary's Swadesh-list appendix)
List of common words in Bangala
List of common words in Lingala

Languages of the Democratic Republic of the Congo
Bangi-Ntomba languages
Lingala language
Languages written in Latin script